Vuzmetinci is a settlement in the Municipality of Ormož in northeastern Slovenia. It lies in the Slovene Hills close to the border with Croatia. The area belongs to the traditional region of Styria. It is now included in the Drava Statistical Region.

References

External links
Vuzmetinci on Geopedia

Populated places in the Municipality of Ormož